The 1987 Arena Football League season was the first season, also known as the "demonstration season", of the Arena Football League (AFL). The league champions were the Denver Dynamite, who defeated the Pittsburgh Gladiators in ArenaBowl I.

Events
The Arena Football League played its inaugural season in 1987 with four teams to introduce the sport to the American public. The Chicago Bruisers, Denver Dynamite, Pittsburgh Gladiators and Washington Commandos comprised the four-team league that ran a schedule from June 19 to August 1. The AFL drew an impressive average of 11,000 fans per game and TV coverage on ESPN. The four teams Pittsburgh (12,856), Denver (12,098/game),  Washington (11,525) and Chicago (8,638) drew fairly well in their respective facilities; Washington and Chicago both managed to outdraw the 1984 averages of their respective USFL franchises, the Federals and Blitz. Denver played at the old McNichols Arena, Pittsburgh at the Civic Arena, Washington at the Capital Centre in Landover, Maryland, and Chicago at the Rosemont Horizon in Rosemont, Illinois (now the Allstate Arena and the only one of the initial AFL venues still extant ).

A fifth arena football team, the Miami Vise, played one exhibition game in 1987, later dubbed the "Showcase Game." The Vise defeated the Bruisers, 33–30, on February 26 but did not carry over to the regular season that summer. The AFL formally kicked off on Friday, June 19, 1987, when the host Pittsburgh Gladiators hosted the Washington Commandos at the Civic Arena in Pittsburgh before 12,177 fans.

AFL football officially began at 7:37 pm EDT that night when Washington's Dale Castro kicked the ball into the slack net (the mesh between the field goal posts) resulting in a touchback. The Gladiators took over on their own five-yard line. The very first play from scrimmage saw Pittsburgh quarterback Mike Hohensee hit WR/DB Russell Hairston on a 45-yard touchdown pass; the play would set the tone for the league's wide-open, high-scoring mandate that the game's inventor, James Foster, envisioned. The Gladiators, featuring future Arena Football League Hall of Famer Craig Walls playing against his brother Kendall, went on to win the game 48–46.

The head coaches of the four AFL teams in 1987 were former CFL great Ray Jauch (Chicago), future longtime AFL coach Tim Marcum (Denver), Joe Haering (Pittsburgh) and Bob Harrison (Washington).

Some of the notable performers for Chicago in 1987 included QB Mike Hold, Jr., FB/LB Billy Stone, WR Reggie Smith, DB Durwood Roquemore and future NFL head coach QB Sean Payton, before he was traded to Pittsburgh and later signed with Ottawa of the CFL.

The Denver Dynamite would also featured a backup QB that would go on to an NFL head coaching career: Marty Mornhinweg, who backed up Whit Taylor. Also on the Dynamite roster that year was FB/LB Rob DeVita, WR Durrell Taylor and future AFL Hall of Fame WR Gary Mullen.

Continuing the theme of quarterbacks who would go on to future coaching opportunities was Gladiators QB Mike Hohensee, who yielded the starting role with Pittsburgh early in the season to Brendan Folmar. Hohensee would return to the ArenaBowl nineteen years later in July 2006 by capturing ArenaBowl XX as head coach of the Chicago Rush.

Gladiators WR Russell Hairston had a 67 catches in 1987, good for 1,126 yards and 18 touchdowns (in just 6 games) and would go on to win AFL MVP honors. Also notable on the Pittsburgh roster was DB Mike Stoops who went on to coach the University of Arizona in 2005.

The Washington Commandos featured a high-scoring unit that had WR Dwayne Dixon (68 catches, 11 TDs) and QB Rich Ingold, who led the AFL with 29 TD passes and 1,726 yards.

ArenaBowl I that year featured the Gladiators hosting the Dynamite at Civic Arena; the Pittsburgh fans, however, went home disappointed as the Dynamite walked away with a 45–16 victory, a win that was the first of seven ArenaBowl titles for Denver coach Tim Marcum.

Standings

y – clinched regular-season title

x – clinched playoff spot

Playoffs

Awards and honors

Regular season awards

All-Arena team

Team movement

References